Fun, Live and Criminal is an album by the band Fun Lovin' Criminals released in 2011. It is released by their former label Kilohertz.

Track listing

Disc one
 Jimi Choo – 3:04
 Classic Fantastic – 3:37
 Big Night Out – 4:21
 Korean Bodega – 2:55
 Loco – 4:06
 The Grave And The Constant – 4:47
 Swashbucklin' In Brooklyn – 4:08
 Back On The Block – 3:53
 Bump – 3:36
 Mister Sun – 4:38
 King Of New York – 4:07
 Mars – 3:44
 Scooby Snacks – 3:15
 Blues For Suckers – 3:32
 Coney Island Girl – 1:41
 We, The Three – 3:07
 Love Unlimited – 4:28
 Live Have Love – 3:24
 We Have All The Time In The World – 4:05
 The Fun Lovin' Criminal – 4:02

Disc two
 I Love Livin' In The City – 4:10
 Bombin' The L – 2:41
 Too Hot – 3:14
 Up On The Hill – Saxophone, Gaz Birtles – 4:10
 City Boy – 3:22
 Passive/Aggressive – 3:27
 Mi Corazon – Saxophone, Gaz Birtles – 3:44
 Southside – 4:45
 Come Find Yourself – 5:02
 I Can't Get With That – 4:33
 Where The Bums Go – 2:09
 10th Street – 2:19
 Smoke 'Em – 5:45
 Got Our Love – 3:26
 The Ballad Of NYC – 6:33
 Methadonia – 3:44
 Bear Hug – 2:34
 Will I Be Ready – 8:15

Disc three
 Take Me Back – 3:45
 How It Be – Saxophone, Gaz Birtles – 4:15
 You Got A Problem – 3:00
 That Ain't Right – 3:11
 Run Daddy Run – 3:06
 Is Ya Alright – 3:07
 The Preacher – 3:08
 Dickholder – 2:27
 Gave Up On God – 5:16
 Friday Night – 5:13
 She Sings At The Sun – 4:02
 Keep On Yellin' – Featuring Roots Manuva – 4:20
 Conversations With Our Attorney – 2:40
 The Girl With The Scar – Saxophone, Gaz Birtles – 4:36
 U No I Bin Livin' – 2:49
 Mothertrucker – 2:37
 Jive – 3:31

References

Fun Lovin' Criminals albums
2011 compilation albums